Meltdown is a remix album by Australian rock synthpop band, Icehouse with tracks remixed by Australian electronic musicians and bands including Infusion, sonicanimation and beXta. It was released in October 2002 within Australia by dIVA Records (Icehouse founder Iva Davies' own label) under Warner Music Australia. The single "Lay Your Hands on Me" (Icehouse Vs. Speed Of Light) peaked at #85 on the Australian singles chart.

The album was re-released, in 2004 by Rock Up label / Star Records, as Street Cafe or more fully Street Cafe and Other Remixed Hits with a slightly different track order and different cover art (see infobox below right).

Track listing 
Meltdown 2002 release
 "Don't Believe Anymore (Cafe Latte Mix)" (Ivan Gough of TV Rock and Colin Snape of The Jenifers) – 9:03
 "Love in Motion" (Wicked Beat Sound System) – 3:38
 "Hey Little Girl" (Infusion) – 4:48
 "Street Cafe" (Smash N Grab) – 3:56
 "Cross the Border" (Sonic Assault Mix Edit) (Funk Corporation) – 4:02
 "Great Southern Land" (Endorphin) – 4:41
 "Electric Blue" (Skipraiders) – 4:09
 "Lay Your Hands on Me" (Icehouse Vs. Speed Of Light) – 3:57
 "We Can Get Together" (sonicanimation) – 3:56
 "Can't Help Myself" (beXta) – 4:13
 "Icehouse" (Pee Wee Ferris & John Ferris) – 5:49
 "Crazy" (Josh G. Abrahams) – 4:11
 "No Promises" ([love] tatto) – 6:55
 "Man of Colours" (Endorphin) – 5:18

''Street Cafe'' 2004 release[Note: same re-mixers as above]
 "Street Cafe" – 3:56
 "Don't Believe Anymore" – 9:03
 "Love in Motion" – 3:38
 "Hey Little Girl" – 4:48
 "Cross the Border" – 4:02
 "Great Southern Land" – 4:41
 "Electric Blue" – 4:09
 "Lay Your Hands on Me" – 3:57
 "We Can Get Together" – 3:56
 "Can't Help Myself" – 4:13
 "Icehouse" – 5:49
 "Crazy" – 4:11
 "No Promises" – 6:55
 "Man of Colours" – 5:18

Personnel 
Credited to:
 Josh G. Abrahams – remixing, mixing
 Endorphin – remixing
 Pee Wee Ferris & John Ferris – remixing
 Darren Glen – producer, remixing
 Ivan Gough – remixing
 Infusion – producer, remixing
 Andy J – producer, remixing
 Steve Millard – executive producer
 Kathy Naunton – mastering @ dB Mastering
 Craig Obey – producer, remixing, mixing
 Skipraiders – remixing
 Colin Snape – remixing
 David Solm – photography
 sonicanimation – remixing
 Voice – design & art direction
 Wicked Beat Sound System – remixing

Charts

References 

Icehouse (band) albums
2002 remix albums
Warner Music Group remix albums